Kiama Downs is a suburb of the town Kiama in the Illawarra region south of Sydney, Australia.

There is a bakery, cafe, pharmacy, supermarket, take-away store, and general practice on Johnson Street.

The western part of the suburb, west of Riverside Drive, is informally known as Gainsborough.

Kiama Downs does not have a school or a railway station. The nearest public primary school is Minnamurra Public School and the nearest public high school is Kiama High School. The nearest railway stations are Minnamurra and Bombo.

The biggest beach is Jones Beach, about one kilometre long, between Minnamurra Point and a headland 30 metres high, of the southern Cathedral Rocks

Australian skateboarder Kieran Woolley is from Kiama Downs.

References

Suburbs of Wollongong
Municipality of Kiama